Azam Jah, Damat Walashan Sahebzada Nawab Sir Mir Himayat Ali Khan Siddiqi Bahadur Bayaffendi (21/22 February 1907 – 9 October 1970) was the eldest son of the seventh and last nizam of Hyderabad, Mir Osman Ali Khan, Asaf Jah VII and Sahebzadi Azam unnisa Begum, daughter of Sahebzada Mir Jahangir Ali Khan Siddiqi.

Life

In 1936 he was given the courtesy title of prince of Berar, a territory of the nizam then leased in perpetuity to the British and administered by them.

Azam Jah married Princess Durru Shehvar, a member of the House of Osman (formerly of the Ottoman Empire) and the daughter of the last Ottoman Caliph Abdülmecid II, in Nice on 12 November 1932. The marriage failed after producing two sons.

On the death of the seventh nizam, the title passed to Azam Jah's elder son, Sahebzada Mir Barkat Ali Khan Siddiqi Mukarram Jah, as eighth nizam. Whereas, Azam's younger son is Sahebzada Mir Karamat Ali Khan Siddiqi Muffakham Jah.

He lived at Bella Vista, Hyderabad, a  palace near Hussain Sagar.

Titles

1907–1912: Second Wali Ahad Nawab Mir Himayat 'Ali Khan Siddiqi Bahadur
1912–1934: Wali Ahad Sahebzada Nawab Mir Himayat 'Ali Khan Bahadur
1934–1937: Major His Highness Azam Jah, Walashan Sahebzada Nawab Mir Himayat 'Ali Khan Siddiqi Bahadur, Prince of Berar
1937–1942: General His Highness Azam Jah, Walashan Sahebzada Nawab Mir Himayat 'Ali Khan Siddiqi Bahadur, Prince of Berar
1942–1947: General His Highness Azam Jah, Walashan Sahebzada Nawab Mir Sir Himayat 'Ali Khan Siddiqi Bahadur, Prince of Berar, GBE
1947–1970: General His Highness Azam Jah, Walashan Sahebzada Nawab Mir Sir Himayat 'Ali Khan Siddiqi Bahadur, Prince of Berar, GCIE, GBE

Notable philanthropy

The (Nizamia Mosque) now known as (London Central Mosque) was funded by the Osman Ali Khan, Asaf Jah VII and the foundation stone of the mosque was laid on Friday, 4 June 1937, by his eldest son - His Highness Prince Azam Jah.

Honours and legacy
(ribbon bar, as it would look today; incomplete)

King George V Silver Jubilee Medal – 1935
King George VI Coronation Medal – 1937
Nizam Silver Jubilee Medal – 1937
Tunis Victory Medal – 1942
Knight Grand Cross of the Order of the British Empire (GBE) – 1943
Defence Medal – 1945
War Medal 1939-1945 – 1945
Hyderabad War Medal – 1945
(Hyderabad) Meritorious Service Medal-1945
Knight Grand Commander of the Order of the Indian Empire (GCIE) – 1946

Namesakes
 Himayatnagar, Hyderabad
 Himayatnagar, Maharashtra
 Himayatnagar, Ranga Reddy district
 Himayat Sagar
 Himayat Bagh, Aurangabad
 Himayat (mango)

References

External links
Time magazine feature

The Hindu: "When marriage brought continents closer"

1907 births
1970 deaths
Knights Grand Commander of the Order of the Indian Empire
Indian Knights Grand Cross of the Order of the British Empire
Nawabs of India
People from Hyderabad district, India
20th-century Indian royalty
Asaf Jahi dynasty